The Balcaia is a right tributary of the river Homorodul Vechi in Romania. It originates near the village of Decebal and flows into the Homorodul Vechi near Dacia. The river is totally channelized and, at present, is part of the drainage system of the Someș plain.

References

 Ritvayné Szomolányi Mária, Szél Sándor, Lázár Attila, Kiss Adrienn, Puskás Erika – Az EU Víz Keretirányelv GIS útmutatójának tesztelése a Szamos vízgyűjtőn 

Rivers of Romania
Rivers of Satu Mare County